Daniel Anthony McNamara (31 December 1970 in Halifax) is an English musician, best known as the lead singer of English band Embrace.

Early years
McNamara and his brother Richard (guitarist) grew up in the village of Bailiff Bridge, Brighouse in West Yorkshire, England.

Aged 11, he passed his 11+ exam and gained entry to Hipperholme Grammar School. When he left school, he studied psychology at Manchester University, but eventually quit to concentrate on the band.

Embrace
Embrace are an English rock band from West Yorkshire. To date they have released eight studio albums, one singles album and one b-sides compilation. The band consists of brothers singer Danny McNamara and guitarist Richard McNamara, bassist Steve Firth, keyboardist Mickey Dale and drummer Mike Heaton. The group has released six studio albums: The Good Will Out (1998) which went to number 1; Drawn from Memory (2000); If You've Never Been (2001); Out of Nothing (2004) which also went to number 1; This New Day (2006) which went to number one spawning their most successful single to date "Natures Law", which just missed the top spot by a few hundred copies. Their sixth, and most recent album self-titled Embrace was released on 28 April 2014 and went top 5 marking a return after 8 years.

Embrace have received critical and commercial acclaim at home where they have picked up several awards and nominations including the best new band award at the NME Brat Awards, and in the US where the band were on the cover of Billboard magazine, and in Thailand where their single "You're Not Alone" stayed at number 1 for six weeks becoming the biggest selling single of that year.
Secret gigs by the band so far have involved playing on beaches and forests, and in a staged break in of the Big Brother TV series house.

After number of 'secret gigs', Embrace had 5 gigs in Scotland in February 2014, prior to a tour of England during April/May 2014. They are due to appear at the 'T in the Park Festival' in July 2014 and 'V Festival' in August 2014.

Conditions
McNamara suffers from the hearing condition, tinnitus, and supported a campaign for the condition. In 2012 he wrote about suffering from PTSD.

DJ
Recently, McNamara and his brother have been involved in DJ sessions.  The first was at Get Loaded in the Park festival in Cardiff, and then on a weekly basis, as part of "Another Music = Another Kitchen" (named after a song by the Buzzcocks), at the Proud Gallery nightclub in Camden, London.

They also did a set for a special aftershow party for their gig at Manchester Apollo in October 2006, which was opened up to the public, as well as one-off sets with Richard in Bristol and Cheltenham, and even more recently in Huddersfield.

References 

1970 births
English male singers
English songwriters
Living people
People from Halifax, West Yorkshire
People educated at Hipperholme Grammar School
21st-century English singers
21st-century British male singers
British male songwriters